Bungi  (also called Bungee, Bungie, Bungay, Bangay, or the Red River Dialect) is a dialect of English with substratal influence from Scottish English, the Orcadian dialect of Scots, Norn, Scottish Gaelic, French, Cree, and Ojibwe (Saulteaux). It was spoken by the Scottish Red River Métis in present-day Manitoba, Canada.

Bungi has been categorized as a post-creole, with the distinctive features of the language gradually abandoned by successive generations of speakers in favour of standard Canadian English. In 1870, about 5,000 Métis were native speakers of Bungi, but by the late 1980s, only a handful of elderly speakers were known. Today, Bungi has very few if any speakers and is potentially extinct.

Bungi was spoken in the Lower Red River Colony in the area from The Forks (where the Red River and Assiniboine River meet in what is now downtown Winnipeg) to the mouth of the Red River at Lake Winnipeg. This is the area where the English/Scottish retired Hudson's Bay Company servants generally settled.

Name of communication system

Spelling
Over the years, Bungi has been spelled many different ways by many different people, and was often referred to simply as the Red River Dialect. Expanded scholarship has preferred "Bungi" as the preferred spelling over "Bungee" and other spellings.

Dialect
In these colloquial uses the term may have mildly pejorative connotations, even when used by speakers to describe themselves. Bungi is unusual as a dialect in that for the Scottish immigrants and the First Nations who developed the dialect, English was often a second language.

Language
Others, such as Brian Orvis, a Bungi-speaker from Selkirk, Manitoba, argued that Bungi is a language unto its own. He asserted that Bungee-speakers do not like to be recorded speaking the language because the First Nations values are that one should not call attention to oneself. It is because of this, he argues, that it is difficult to document Bungi, and the speakers will often deny knowledge of the language.

Name of a people
In addition to the being the name of a dialect, the word Bungi might have referred to a specific group of Métis of Scottish ancestry. The earliest records report that the name "Bungee" was used by the British, and especially Hudson's Bay Company employees to refer to the Saulteaux. Sometime around the turn of the 20th century, the word Bungi began to be used to refer to people of Scottish and First Nations ancestry.

Description

The most notable particularity of Bungi is its phonology (sound system and pronunciation). Voice quality differences are also apparent. The lexicon is mostly English with borrowings from Gaelic, Cree, Ojibwa, and other languages.

Several researchers have studied Bungi. Margaret Stobie studied Bungi and visited several communities where Bungi was spoken. In her 1971 article, The Dialect Called Bungi, Stobie reported that Bungi was the English dialect spoken by the descendants of Gaelic-speaking Highlanders. Blain conducted one of the most thorough academic studies of Bungi in her thesis and other publications, The Bungee Dialect of the Red River Settlement (1989). Blain's research found extremely negative attitudes to Bungi among the population which had spoken it in previous generations, a factor which likely contributed to its near extinction by the time of her research. The study records the dialect in its final phase, when considerable levelling towards standard Canadian English was present.

Bungi was spoken with a distinctive rhythm with a Gaelic fall, including the way that syllables are stressed, repetition of both nouns and pronouns in a sentence (e.g. "My brother is coming, him."), changes in the pronunciation of phonemes (e.g. the phonemic distinction between [s] and [š] in not present in Western Cree dialects, and were reversed in Bungi from the standard English), etc. The third-person pronouns in Cree do not distinguish between masculine and feminine, which resulted in the interchangeable use of he and she in Bungi without regard for gender (e.g. "My wife he is going to the store."). Bungee borrowed words and structures from the parent languages (e.g. the standard Bungee greeting of "I'm well, you but?" came directly from Cree). Bungi speakers also reported that Bungi uses Cree vowels and Scots consonants. It often uses Cree syntax.

Social context and extinction of Bungi as a spoken dialect
Prior to 1938, people were already expressing concerns about the potential loss of Bungi. In letters to the Winnipeg Evening Tribune, Mr. J. J. Moncrief, writing under the pen name "Old Timer," and Osborne Scott expressed their concerns about the survival of the Red River dialect. Others wrote in letters to the editor of the same newspaper in 1938 that Bungi would be gone in a generation.

In her thesis, The Bungee Dialect of the Red River Settlement (1989), Blain discusses the ways in which Bungi-speaking families were excluded (whether this was intentional discrimination by the community or because of reluctance on the part of the family is not known), including not having their family history included in local history books, being assigned to wash an enormous amount of dishes away from the festivities at events, people trying to hide their Indigenous ancestry, shame about how they sound when they spoke Bungi, etc. Blain also notes that Bungi was in a constant state of change that was evolving towards the local standard English.

Swan also reports the prejudice towards Bungi speakers in her thesis, Ethnicity and the Canadianization of Red River Politics (1991). She suggests that Anglo-Métis Manitoba Premier John Norquay, who was born near St. Andrews in what was the Red River Colony and would have spoken Bungi, had dropped his accent by the time that he had entered politics.

The social prejudice towards Bungi speakers and the very sensitive linguistic environment ultimately led to the extinction of this dialect.

Scholarship
The main linguistic documentation of this dialect were conducted by Eleanor M. Blain (1987, 1989), Francis "Frank" J. Walters (1969–1970,), Margaret Stobie (1967–68, 1970, 1971) and Elaine Gold (2007, 2009). Osborne Scott also contributed to the understanding of Bungi (1937, 1951).

Examples of Bungi

Example from J. J. Moncrieef article
In an article titled Red River Dialect published in 1936 under the pseudonym Old Timer (a nom de plume commonly used by J. J. Moncrieef who was from the Shetland Islands), the author provided an excerpt from a letter that had some Bungi.

Examples from Osborne Scott's Red River Dialect article
Osborne Scott gave a talk on the radio at CKY on December 7, 1937, about Bungi (the talk was later published in the Winnipeg Evening Tribune on December 12, 1937, with the title Red River Dialect and again as a slightly longer article in 1951 in The Beaver, also with the title of Red River Dialect).

Another story was recounted in the same article.

Scott also recounted a discussion that he had overheard.

Scott also recounted a discussion that he had been a part of.

In the same article, Scott provided a few more examples and definitions of words:
 " 'Bye me I kakatch [nearly] killed it two ducks with wan sot.' "
 " 'Keeyam' meaning never mind, let it go. 'Girl Keeyam if you take my neechimos (sweetheart) I'll get me another whatefer!' "
 " 'Chimmuck," one of those words whose sound suits the sense, represents the sound a stone makes when falling perpendicular into water, for instance, 'he fell off the rock chimmuck in lake.' "
 " 'The canoe went apeechequanee and they went chimmuck,' apeechequanee meaning head over heels."
 " 'I know by where there is a fine bus of neepinnans (high bush cranberries).' "
 "Paper and pepper were pronounced 'pepper,' and you indicated whether it was eating or writing that you wanted."
 "Some French words were incorporated in the dialect, as for instance, a trunk or box was a 'cassette.' "
 "The Scots word 'byre' was always used instead of stable or cowshead."
 "They never put out a fire or candle, it was always 'slocked.' "
 " 'Mooneas' was one Cree word which was used to great effect by the native. It means greenhorn or newcomer."

Scott said that First Nations words were used in Bungi most often as "picturesque short words, generally exclamatory". In addition, the names of birds, animals, and plants were commonly First Nations words, as these things were new to the immigrants.

In a later, updated version of the article in 1951 that included parts of the original radio broadcast that were not in The Winnipeg Evening Tribune article, Osborne also told of a young Canon M. Sanderson learning to pronounce [s] and [š] under the tutelage of Rev. S. P. Matheson. When Sanderson was working with Rev. J. J. Anderson as his assistant, Anderson reported to Matheson that he had overdone it—instead of saying "God save the Queen," Sanderson had said "God shave the Queen." However, Sanderson would discredit this idea in a letter to the editor, called Canon Sanderson Drops into Red River Dialect in response to Osborne's 1937 article ad radio address, and also included some examples of words in Bungi.

Examples from letters in support of Osborne Scott
In a letter to the editor titled Aw, My Fer You, Osborne Scott!, an anonymous person using the pseudonym Bung-gay (a nom de plume for Islay Mary (Charles) Sinclair, who was said could not speak Bungi but rather imitate it from having lived in the community for a long time) wrote a letter to the editor in Bungi that Blain named the McBean Letter. The letter was in response to an irate letter titled Not Offensive to Red River Descendants about Scott's article submitted by Mrs. A. Kipling on January 7, 1938. Kipling felt that Scott had belittled and insulted the Bungi speakers of the Red River, when in fact Osborne and another contributor (likely Mr. J. J. Moncrieff under the pseudonym An Old Timer) were saddened by the vanishing of Bungi and that their children would not know the accents and dialect, and wanted to remember the humour as well.

In another letters to the editor in support of Scott, called Oldtimer Appreciates Osborne Scott's Article, Mary I. Kennedy contributed examples of Bungi:
 " 'I'll not can do it me, whatever but.' Expressive of utter impossibility."
 " A man of the country was in the hospital for some time, and a friends called to see him. 'You got a garden, bye?' 'Eh! Eh! A fine garden and suts fine celery. Bye, you never seen suts fine celery. My faather's buried somewhere about here.' "
 "Then John exclaimed 'Tgh high! (pronounced as in light) I nuvvur see such a what fur a ox."
She also included a few stories of nicknames, such as a family by the name of Johnstone who were christened with "Teapot" for their addiction to tea, which was more familiar and seen as a distinguishing mark for them.

Example from discussion of Victoria Cottage (Bunn House)
Another example of Bungi with a standard English translation is provided through Red River North Heritage as a part of their geocache work (this is for Site 1: Bunn's Road). This is Rachel Bunn telling the story of how her husband, Thomas Bunn, built a stone house known as Victoria Cottage (which is now a historic site). A modern recording of this being spoken is also available on the Red River North Heritage website. The exact origin of this text is not provided.

The Shtory of Little Red Ridin Hood
D. A. Mulligan wrote the story of Little Red Riding Hood as it would have been told in Bungi, titled The Shtory of Little Red Ridin Hood.

Blain's thesis The Bungee Dialect of the Red River Settlement
In her thesis, The Bungee Dialect of the Red River Settlement, Eleanor Blain provides an extensive discussion on Bungi, with examples of words and phrases used in Bungi, as well as a transcription of Walters' story This is What I'm Thinkin as part of an appendix (both a linguistic version and a reading version).

Walters' Bungi audio collection
Frank Walters was a historian that was interested in preserving Bungi heritage. He conducted a study of Bungi, and made a series of recordings known as the Bungee Collection (also known as the Walters Collection).

Notable Bungi speakers
Manitoba Premier John Norquay

See also

 Anglo-Métis
 Beurla Reagaird
 Canadian Gaelic
 Chinook Jargon
 Métis National Council
 Michif language
 Newfoundland Irish
 Red River Colony
 Scots language
 Scottish Gaelic
 Scottish Indian trade

References 

Languages of Canada
Métis culture
Endangered pidgins and creoles
Culture of Manitoba
Scots dialects
Indigenous languages of the North American Subarctic
Indigenous languages of the North American Plains
Scottish English
Scottish Gaelic dialects
Scottish-Canadian culture
Cree language
Anishinaabe languages
English-based pidgins and creoles
Métis in Manitoba